The Brigade of Abu al-Fadl al-Abbas (Arabic:لواء أبو الفضل العباس, Liwa Abu al-Fadl al-Abbas), also known as the al-Abbas Brigade (Arabic:كتائب العباس, Kata'ib al-Abbas), is a pro-government Twelver Shia Muslim militant group operating throughout Syria. It is named after the nickname of Al-Abbas ibn Ali, son of Imam Ali.

The group was formed in late 2012 to defend the Sayyidah Zaynab Mosque and other Shia holy sites in Syria. It rose in prominence in reaction to the desecration of various shrines, heritage sites, and places of worship by Syrian rebels during the Syrian civil war, and subsequently collaborated with the Syrian Army. Its fighters include Shia Damascenes, Damascus-based Shia Iraqi refugees, and foreign Shia volunteers, mostly from Iraq. It fights primarily around Damascus, but has fought in Aleppo as well.

In May and June 2013, Reuters reported a split had developed within the brigade over finances and leadership which led to violence. Many non-Syrian members subsequently formed a different brigade.

On 19 May 2014, fighters from the Nour al-Din al-Zanki Brigade claimed to have taken over the al-Abbas Brigade's regional headquarters in Aleppo.

As the Islamic State in Iraq and the Levant made significant gains in Iraq in mid-2014, many its Iraqi members returned home to defend the faltering government in Baghdad. The al-Abbas Bridge took part in the 2018 Southern Syria offensive in support of government troops.

See also

 List of armed groups in the Syrian Civil War
 Quwat Abu al-Fadhal al-Abbas
 Holy Shrine Defender

References

Anti-ISIL factions in Syria
Pro-government factions of the Syrian civil war
Resistance movements
Shia Islamist groups
Shia organizations
Syrian Shia organizations
Military units and formations established in 2012
Organizations designated as terrorist by the United Arab Emirates
Organizations based in Asia designated as terrorist
Jihadist groups in Syria
Jihadist groups in Iraq
Arab militant groups
Axis of Resistance